Encounters is the fourth short story anthology published by the Canberra Speculative Fiction Guild. Printed in 2004 and edited by Maxine McArthur and Donna Maree Hanson, it contains stories from several Australian speculative fiction authors.

Stories
The collection contains the following stories:
"Vortle" by Lee Battersby
"Davey's Gift" by Kate Eltham
"The Souvenir" by Richard Harland
"Don't Got No Wings" by Trent Jamieson
"Garden Light" by Shane M. Brown
"The Flatmate From Hell" by Dirk Flinthart
"The Ceremony of Innocence" by Conor Bendle
"Crazy Little Thing" by Stuart Barrow
"Una, the One" by Frankie Seymour
"The Faithless Priest and the Nameless King" by Cory Daniells
"Stella's Transformation" by Kim Westwood
"Boys" by Ben Payne
"Sleeping With Monsters" by Michael Barry
"Remembering Bliss" by Carol Ryles
"Guarding the Mound" by Kaaron Warren
"The Final Battle" by Scott Robinson
"Meltdown my Plutonium Heart" by Cat Sparks
"Beggars on the Shore" by Bruce Clark
"The Teller" by Monica Carroll
"Happy Faces For Happy Families" by Gillian Polack
"The Dove" by Nigel Read
"The Glass Flower" by Chris Barnes

All stories are illustrated by Les Petersen.

See also
Nor of Human
Machinations: An Anthology of Ingenious Designs
Elsewhere
The Outcast
Gastronomicon
The Grinding House

External links
CSFG home page
Maxine McArthur home page
Les Petersen home page

2004 anthologies
Fiction anthologies